The Union of Chiefs and Peoples of the North (UCPN) was a political party in Togo.

History
The party was established in 1951 as an organisation representing traditional chiefs and notables from northern Togoland, and was allied with the pro-French Togolese Party of Progress (PTP). In the December 1951 Representative Assembly elections it won 12 of the 24 Second College seats. In the 1952 elections it won 15 of the 30 seats. It won 15 seats again in the 1955 elections, but was reduced to ten seats in the 1958 elections as the Assembly was increased in size to 46 seats.

In October 1959 the party merged with the PTP to form the Democratic Union of the Togolese People.

References

Defunct political parties in Togo
Political parties established in 1951
1951 establishments in French Togoland
Political parties disestablished in 1959
1959 disestablishments in French Togoland